Centre Township is the name of some places in the U.S. state of Pennsylvania:

 Centre Township, Berks County, Pennsylvania
 Centre Township, Perry County, Pennsylvania
 Centre Township, later split into North Centre Township and South Centre Township in Columbia County

See also 
 North Centre Township, Columbia County, Pennsylvania
 South Centre Township, Columbia County, Pennsylvania
 Center Township, Pennsylvania (disambiguation)

Pennsylvania township disambiguation pages